The Gran Hotel Bolívar, is a historic hotel located on Plaza San Martín in Lima, Peru.  Designed by noted Peruvian architect Rafael Marquina, it was built in 1924 and was the first large, modern hotel built in Lima.

Part of a program to modernize Lima, the hotel was constructed on what was state property. The hotel was inaugurated on December 6, 1924, in honor of the centenary of the Battle of Ayacucho, a decisive military encounter during the Peruvian War of Independence. The square itself was inaugurated on July 27, 1921, in celebration of the 100th anniversary of Peru's independence.

In the 1940s and 1950s, the hotel attracted Hollywood movie stars such as Orson Welles, Ava Gardner, and John Wayne, where many also discovered the local cocktail, the Pisco Sour.

Gallery

References

External links
 Gran Hotel Bolivar - official website

Further reading
 García Bryce, José (1980), "La Arquitectura del Virreinato y La República". En: Historia del Perú, tomo XII, Lima: Editorial Juan Mejía Baca.
 

Hotel buildings completed in 1924
Hotels established in 1924
Hotels in Lima